Mark Lindsay Chapman (born 8 September 1954) is an English actor. He is known for his roles as Chief Officer Henry Wilde in the film Titanic (1997), as John Lennon in the film Chapter 27 (2007) and as Dr. Anton Arcane on the USA Network TV series Swamp Thing from 1990 to 1993.

Career 

He attended the Guildford School of Acting where he studied ballet, speech, drama, and fencing.

His television credits include: Max Headroom, Dallas (as Brett Lomax), Falcon Crest, Baywatch, Murder, She Wrote, Lois and Clark: The New Adventures of Superman, JAG, Charmed, The Young and the Restless, Swamp Thing, and The Langoliers. He played Chief Officer Henry Tingle Wilde in the 1997 film Titanic. A Paramount internal memo dated from 1987 has revealed that Chapman was once considered for the part of Data in Star Trek: The Next Generation.

The similarity between his name and that of John Lennon's murderer, Mark David Chapman, prevented him in 1985 from playing Lennon in John and Yoko: A Love Story, a biographical film produced by NBC; Yoko Ono had been deeply involved in the production and had herself been initially impressed with his audition and approved his casting prior to discovering his full name was Mark Lindsay Chapman. She then nixed his casting on the grounds it was "bad karma", and a great deal of press attention was given to his having almost gotten the role (Chapman changed his name to Lindsay when he joined Equity, as there was already a Mark Chapman in the union). The role went instead to Mark McGann.  Chapman's full name surfaced again when the story was published in Britain, and reporters began making inquiries about the actor, who was then working as a bricklayer with his father.

Eventually Lindsay did portray Lennon, in the 2007 film Chapter 27, which had Mark David Chapman as the lead character.

Personal life 
Lindsay was arrested in March 2018 for assaulting his then-girlfriend, Tara Pirnia, after she ended their five-year relationship. According to an affidavit obtained from the Travis County Sheriff's office, he flew into a "violent rage" after she asked him to delete intimate material of her on his cell phone. She filed a restraining order afterward.

Filmography

Film

Television

References

External links

1954 births
Male actors from London
English male film actors
English male television actors
Living people
English expatriates in the United States
20th-century English male actors
21st-century English male actors
Alumni of the Guildford School of Acting